Western Colorado may refer to:

Colorado Western Slope, the portion of the U.S. State of Colorado that drains into the Colorado River
Western Colorado Community College, Grand Junction, Colorado
Western Colorado University, Gunnison, Colorado
Western Colorado Mountaineers, its athletics teams
Episcopal Diocese of Western Colorado, former

See also
Western Colorado Botanical Gardens, Grand Junction, Colorado
Western Colorado Center for the Arts, Grand Junction, Colorado